Oude Molen Technical High School (Afrikaans:  Hoër Tegniese Oude Molen) is a semi-private dual-medium co-educational Technical school situated in  Pinelands in the city of Cape Town in the Western Cape province of  South Africa, it is one of the top and most academic technical schools in Western Cape.

References

External links
 

Schools in Cape Town